Béla Belicza is a Hungarian sprint canoeist who competed from 1997 to 2001. Despite not qualifying for Hungary in the Summer Olympics, he won nine medals at the ICF Canoe Sprint World Championships. this included four golds (C-1 200 m: 1997, C-4 200 m: 2001, C-4 1000 m: 1998, 2001), three silvers (C-1 500 m: 1997, C-4 200 m: 1997, C-4 500 m: 2001), and two bronzes (C-1 1000 m: 1997, C-4 1000 m: 1999.

Awards
 Hungarian canoer of the Year (1): 1997

References

Hungarian male canoeists
Living people
Year of birth missing (living people)
ICF Canoe Sprint World Championships medalists in Canadian
20th-century Hungarian people
21st-century Hungarian people